Aquiles is a client for .NET (3.5 or above) to access Apache Cassandra (0.6 or above).

Features
Aquiles adds following functionality:
 .NET-friendly interface to Cassandra operations.
 Byte Enconder Helpers avoid need to create and manage self-created types, like Long, UTF8, ASCII, GUID, UUID etc.
 Choose what EndpointManager to use
 Choose what Transport to use
 Configure what ConnectionPool necessary to use and its internal parameters.
 Connection pool having warm-up and size-control capabilities
 Endpoint Manager: manages all the entry-point nodes to a cluster and will automatically distribute the connections against all the cluster endpoints defined besides checking for healthiness of the nodes (defensive node health check strategy).
 Handling more than one cluster in application
 Managed (add, modify, remove) Keyspaces and ColumnFamily objects (since version 0.7.X)
 Monitors features out-of-the-box and all connections to Cassandra by the Performance Monitor (native with Windows) by implementing PerformanceCounterHelper fwk.
 Prior Keyspace and ColumnFamily existence validation against a cluster information (taken out since version 0.7.X)
 Simple and user-friendly configuration section to configure all clusters
 Validation of command parameters:
 Input Parameter Completeness: It is no more necessary to go against a cluster to detect that parameters are missing.

Supported commands
Aquiles supports all Cassandra comments and some system comments.

Most common commands
Here is the list of the most used commands:

System commands

See also
 Apache Cassandra
 Distributed data stores

References

External links
 The Aquiles homepage

.NET software
Clients (computing)
Distributed data stores